The huge moth family Noctuidae contains the following genera:

A B C D E F G H I J K L M N O P Q R S T U V W X Y Z

Fabiania
Facastis
Facidia
Facidina
Fagitana
Fala
Falana
Falcapyris
Falcimala
Farara
Faronta
Fautaua
Feigeria
Felinia
Feliniopsis
Feltia
Fenaria
Feralia
Feredayia
Ferenta
Fergana
Fimbriosotis
Fishia
Fissipunctia
Flammona
Flavyigoga
Fleta
Fletcheria
Floccifera
Focillidia
Focillistis
Focillodes
Focillopis
Fodina
Folka
Formosamyna
Forsebia
Fota
Fotella
Fotopsis
Foveades
Fracara
Franclemontia
Fredina
Freilla
Friesia
Frivaldszkyola
Fruva
Fulvarba
Funepistis
Furvabromias

References 

 Natural History Museum Lepidoptera genus database

 
Noctuid genera F